"Entre Nous" ("Between Us" in French) is the fourth track on the 1980 album Permanent Waves by progressive rock band Rush. It was also released as a single. The only live performances of the song to date occurred during the 2007 leg of the tour to promote Snakes & Arrows, an album released on May 1 of that year. It was then featured on the live album released on April 15, 2008.

Rolling Stone magazine called the song a "straight-ahead rocker with an artfully segued acoustic chorus."  Cash Box called it a "whirling yet highly melodic track" and said it has "a grandiose opening of synthesizer and drum crescendoes." Record World called it a "melodic rocker that spotlights Geddy Lee's stellar vocal."

Title
According to Robert Telleria, the title, which means "between us" in French, comes from Ayn Rand's 1943 novel The Fountainhead and captures the sense of rapport Neil Peart feels with members of the audience. In some foreign pressings, the label included the English translation.

Personnel 
 Geddy Lee – lead vocals, bass guitar, synthesizer
 Alex Lifeson – guitars
 Neil Peart – drums

References

1980 singles
1980 songs
Rush (band) songs
Song recordings produced by Terry Brown (record producer)
Songs written by Neil Peart
Songs written by Geddy Lee
Songs written by Alex Lifeson
Mercury Records singles
Rock ballads
Progressive pop songs